= The Internet of Elsewhere =

2011 book by Cyrus Farivar

The Internet of Elsewhere: The Emergent Effects of a Wired World
- First edition
- Author: Cyrus Farivar
- Language: English
- Genre: Non-fiction
- Publisher: Rutgers University Press
- Publication date: 2011
- Publication place: United States
- ISBN: 0813549620

The Internet of Elsewhere: The Emergent Effects of a Wired World (ISBN 0813549620) is a 2011 book by Cyrus Farivar, published by Rutgers University Press. The book explores the history and effects of the Internet in South Korea, Senegal, Estonia and Iran.

Farivar says he chose the four nations profiled because "they each represent vastly different experiences when it comes to the Internet". The Atlantic chose the book for its 2011 list of "10 Essential Books for Thought-Provoking Summer Reading".
